In Greek mythology, Cabeiro (or Kabeiro) was a sea nymph who lived on the island of Lemnos. She was a daughter of the shape-shifting marine god Proteus. After being thrown out of Mount Olympus, the Greek forge god Hephaestus fathered three sons known as the Cabeiri and the three Cabeirian nymphs with her.

Notes

References
 Strabo, Geography, translated by Horace Leonard Jones; Cambridge, Massachusetts: Harvard University Press; London: William Heinemann, Ltd. (1924). LacusCurtis, Online version at the Perseus Digital Library, Books 6–14

Consorts of Hephaestus
Nymphs